Rouleina is a genus of slickheads. The genus is named for the ichthyologist Louis Roule.

Species
There are currently 10 recognized species in this genus:
 Rouleina attrita (Vaillant, 1888) (Softskin smooth-head)
 Rouleina danae A. E. Parr, 1951
 Rouleina eucla Whitley, 1940 (Eucla slickhead)
 Rouleina euryops Sazonov, 1999
 Rouleina guentheri (Alcock, 1892) (Bordello slickhead)
 Rouleina livida (A. B. Brauer, 1906)
 Rouleina maderensis Maul, 1948 (Madeiran smooth-head)
 Rouleina nuda (A. B. Brauer, 1906)
 Rouleina squamilatera (Alcock, 1898) (Bluntsnout slickhead)
 Rouleina watasei (S. Tanaka (I), 1909)

References

Alepocephalidae
Taxa named by Henry Weed Fowler
Marine fish genera